Jonathan Chase (born Jonathan Shane Greenfield) is an American actor.

Life and career
Chase was born Jonathan Shane Greenfield in Plantation, Florida. A graduate of the University of Florida, he is known for his role as Cash during the final season of the UPN show One on One starring Kyla Pratt. Chase has appeared in the films Another Gay Movie (2006) and Dead Tone (2007), before starring in the 2005 horror film The Gingerdead Man opposite Gary Busey. Chase guest-starred in episodes of the CW series Veronica Mars and the Emmy Award-winning series Monk.

In New York City, Chase trained with the Upright Citizens Brigade, strengthening his improvisation skills and comic timing.

In 2009, Chase had a minor role in the film Gamer, as the unnamed character "Geek Leader". He also voiced Patrick Connolly in the 2011 video game L.A. Noire, developed by Rockstar Games.

Chase portrayed Sam Parker in the Oprah Winfrey Network sitcom Love Thy Neighbor, which premiered on May 29, 2013, and played Alan in the 2018 series American Woman.

Filmography

References

External links
 

21st-century American male actors
American male film actors
American male television actors
Living people
Male actors from Florida
People from Plantation, Florida
University of Florida alumni
Year of birth missing (living people)